is a former Japanese professional baseball pitcher and currently pitting coach for the Tohoku Rakuten Golden Eagles of the Nippon Professional Baseball (NPB). He played for the Tokyo Yakult Swallows of the NPB.

Background
Tateyama began his professional career in 2003 with the Yakult Swallows and became a regular pitcher from the 2004 season and from 2008, a regular starter for the team. At this time his performances improved and he led the Central League in winning percentage with 0.800 (12-3). The next year, he led the league in victories, with 16, despite a 3.39 ERA, and in 2010 and 2011 he led the league in shutouts, becoming monthly MVP in August 2010. He was the monthly MVP again in April and September 2012.

On September 13, 2019, he held press conference with Kazuhiro Hatakeyama about his retirement. On October 14, 2019, Tateyama become second squad pitting coach for the Tohoku Rakuten Golden Eagles of NPB.

References

External links

NPB official site

1981 births
Living people
Japanese baseball coaches
Japanese baseball players
Nihon University alumni
Nippon Professional Baseball pitchers
Nippon Professional Baseball coaches
Baseball people from Kanagawa Prefecture
Tokyo Yakult Swallows players
Yakult Swallows players